The Esailing World Championship (ESWC) is an annual esports competition, first held in 2018 and officially recognized by World Sailing the main sports governing body. 
Esailing consist on real time regatta simulation via video game.
 
The video game support of the competition since 2018 is provided by the french company Virtual Regatta.  Esailing is also one of the 5 esport disciplines selected by the International Olympic Committee for the Olympics Virtual Series(OVS).

Esailing World Championship - Results

Team Esailing World Championship - nations'Cup
Since 2020, the Esailing Team World Championship are also organized among supporting national federations of World Sailing.

Esailing Nations Medal Scoreboard
Ranking of nation by medal obtained in Esailing World Championships from World Sailing

Olympics Virtual Series (OVS) Esailing Champions
During the Spring 2021,  The Olympics Virtual Series where held. For the first time, 5 esports disciplines organized esport Competition under the Olympic realm. 

Esailing being one of the 5 selected esports. 

The Inshore Series featured three action-fueled events which each crowned a winner and runner ups. The three events were split into three boat types; the 49’er, Laser and Nacra 17, and took place on the shores of Kiel, Rio de Janeiro and Marseille.

Laser - 25 May 2021

49er - 6 June 2021

Nacra -  23 June 2021

The Offshore Race was a race from Rio to Tokyo.

References 

Sailing
E Sports
Sailing
Sailing